The Chinmaya Sisters, Uma and Radhika, are Carnatic music singing duo

Early life
The sisters were taught Carnatic music by their mother Bhavani Natesan, and went on to receive training from T. N. Seshagopalan and Neyveli Santhanagopalan.

Musical career
Their first concert was in 1992 in the "Spirit of Youth" Series of the Music Academy.  In 2003 they were invited by Carnatic Music Association of North America-New Jersey for a concert to perform in USA. They have also performed in the music series organised by Kamban Kazhagam in Colombo-SriLanka. later in 2018 the duo performed in Navarasam, a thematic concert organised by Rasikapriya Fine Arts Academy. later they have performed at the Swaralaya Samanwayam Festival held in Palakkad. they have become a regular performer and part of the Margazhi season music festival. They have also given performance in Doordarshan & they are ‘A’ graded artists of All India Radio.

Discography
Performed for "Naada Vaibavam" of "Art of Living" in which 5000 musicians group rendition

Awards 

 "Vani Kala Nipuna" from Sri Thyaga Brahma Gana Sabha in 2012
 "Yuva Kala Bharathi" from Bharath Kalachar in 2006

References

External links

Carnatic musicians
Living people
Year of birth missing (living people)
Carnatic singers